Lau Si-io (劉仕堯)  is a civil servant in Macau and the second Secretariat for Transport and Public Works.

Biography 

Lau was born and raised in Macau, high school graduated from Yuet Wah College. He obtained an engineering graduate from the University of Calgary. After three years in the private sector (1982–1984), Lau joined the civil service and worked for the then Leal Senado.

Lau has held various civil service positions:

 Assistant technician, Public Works Department
 Chief of sector, Public Works Department
 Chief of division, Public Works Department
 Chief of the Hygiene and Cleansing Department
 Vice-president and president of the Leal Senado
 Vice-president of the executive board of the Provisional Municipal Council of Macau
 President of the Administration Committee of the Civic and Municipal Affairs Bureau, 2002–2007

See also 
 Politics of Macau

References 
 Lau Si-io appointed as Secretary for Transport and Public Works – Website of MSAR Government Information Bureau

Living people
Government ministers of Macau
Year of birth missing (living people)
University of Calgary alumni